Örn Steinsen  (born ) is an Icelandic former footballer. He was part of the Iceland national football team between 1959 and 1961. He played 8 matches, scoring 1 goal.

See also
 List of Iceland international footballers
 :fr:Örn Steinsen

References

Further reading
 
 

Steinsen, Orn
Steinsen, Orn
Icelandic footballers
Iceland international footballers
Icelandic male footballers
Steinsen, Orn
Steinsen, Orn
Icelandic people with family names